Soul Stirrin is an album by American trombonist Bennie Green, recorded in 1958 and released on the Blue Note label.

Reception

The AllMusic review by Stephen Thomas Erlewine stated: "Soul Stirrin'  is an invigorating, exciting date from trombonist Bennie Green, showcasing his wide range of skills. .. Each musician plays with soul and passion, both on the laidback blues and mambos and the rollicking swing numbers. It's a thoroughly enjoyable record and one that is a good introduction to Green's wonderful, friendly style."

Track listing
All compositions by Bennie Green except as indicated
 "Soul Stirrin'" (Babs Gonzales) - 6:50
 "We Wanna Cook" - 6:38
 "That's All" (Alan Brandt, Bob Haymes) - 6:25
 "Lullaby of the Doomed" (Gonzales) - 6:01
 "B. G. Mambo" - 8:15
 "Black Pearl" (Bill Graham) - 5:45
 "Soul Stirrin'" [alternate take] (Gonzales) - 6:44 Bonus track on CD reissue
Recorded at Van Gelder Studio, Hackensack, New Jersey on April 28, 1958.

Personnel
Bennie Green - trombone, vocals
Gene Ammons, Billy Root - tenor saxophone
Sonny Clark - piano
Ike Isaacs - bass
Elvin Jones - drums
Babs Gonzales - vocals (tracks 1, 2 & 7)

References 

Blue Note Records albums
Bennie Green albums
1958 albums
Albums produced by Alfred Lion
Albums recorded at Van Gelder Studio